was a district located in Hyōgo Prefecture, Japan.

As of 2003, the district had an estimated population of 9,486 and a density of 168.04 persons per km2. The total area was 56.45 km2.

Former towns and villages
 Yokawa

Merger
 On October 24, 2005 - the town of Yokawa was merged into the expanded city of Miki. Minō District was dissolved as a result of this merger.

Former districts of Hyōgo Prefecture